The Weinan North railway station is a railway station of Zhengzhou–Xi'an High-Speed Railway and Datong–Xi'an Passenger Railway located in Linwei District of Weinan city in Shaanxi province, China.

Name
The station during construction was called New Weinan railway station but following its completion it was renamed Weinan North railway station, in accordance with its location.

Service
The station is located on the north end of the Cangcheng Road, just on the south side of the Wei River. The station itself is part of the world third longest bridge Weinan Weihe Grand Bridge. It was opened on 6 February 2010, along with the Zhengzhou–Xi'an high-speed railway. On 1 July 2014, with the completion Datong–Xi'an Passenger Railway, the station is served by two high speed railway lines.

There are more than 60 trains serve the station daily, making it the most important railway hub in eastern part of Shaanxi province. The trains connect Weinan with major Chinese cities like Beijing, Changsha, Guangzhou, Shanghai, Shenzhen, Taiyuan, Wuhan, Xi'an and Zhengzhou.

The station is a major transportation point in the Weinan city, several local bus lines connect the station with the city proper.

See also
Weinan railway station
Weinan West railway station

References

Railway stations in Shaanxi
Railway stations in Weinan
Stations on the Xuzhou–Lanzhou High-Speed Railway
Railway stations in China opened in 2010